Matyáš Hanč (born 27 July 2004) is a Czech professional footballer who plays as a defender for Pardubice.

Club career
On 10 April 2022, Hanč made his debut for Pardubice, after graduating from the club's academy, in a 4–0 loss against Slavia Prague.

International career
In November 2021, Hanč made his debut for Czech Republic's under-18 side in a double header against Austria.

References

2004 births
Living people
Czech footballers
Association football defenders
Czech Republic youth international footballers
FK Pardubice players
Czech First League players